Elections to the Labour Party's Shadow Cabinet (more formally, its "Parliamentary Committee") took place on 4 December 1980, having been delayed due to the October election of new Party Leader Michael Foot. In addition to the 12 members elected, the Leader (Foot), Deputy Leader (Denis Healey), Labour Chief Whip (Michael Cocks), Labour Leader in the House of Lords (Lord Peart), and Chairman of the Parliamentary Labour Party (Fred Willey) were automatically members.

Two winners of the 1979 election were not re-elected: Healey was elected Deputy Leader of the Labour Party, so did not need to run for election to the Shadow Cabinet. David Owen did not return. He informed Michael Foot of his decision not to run in November, after the PLP rejected "one member, one vote" and it became clearer to him that he would be defecting. Not long afterward, he joined Bill Rodgers (who did win a seat in the Shadow Cabinet), Shirley Williams, and Roy Jenkins in founding the Social Democratic Party. Because of Rodgers's defection, Tony Benn joined the Shadow Cabinet in January 1981 by virtue of being the top loser.

The 12 winners of the election are listed below:

References

1980
Labour Party (UK) Shadow Cabinet election
Labour Party (UK) Shadow Cabinet election